Edward Francis Searles (July 4, 1841 – August 6, 1920) was an interior and architectural designer.

Biography
Searles was born on July 4, 1841, in Methuen, Massachusetts, US to Jesse Gould Searles (1805–1844) and Sarah (Littlefield) Searles. His father worked in a local cotton mill and operated a small farm.

On November 7, 1887, Searles married Mary Frances Hopkins ( Sherwood), a wealthy widow 22 years his senior. The widow of Mark Hopkins, her assets included 25% ownership of the Central Pacific Railroad. Searles was the designer of Mary's new home in Great Barrington, Massachusetts, which is now referred to as the Searles Castle, from the 1885 groundbreaking, to its completion in 1888.

After Mary's death in 1891, Searles was left with his wife's vast real estate holdings in San Francisco, New York, Great Barrington, and Methuen, and $21 million. He died August 6, 1920.

During the remainder of his life, he satisfied his love of architecture by building a number of grand structures, frequently in collaboration with architect Henry Vaughan.

Collaborations with Vaughan include:
 Serlo Organ Hall (completed 1909) and Pine Lodge Mansion in Methuen, MA
 Stillwater Manor, a 24-room 3-story mansion in Salem, New Hampshire
 Stanton Harcourt Castle, now known as Searles Castle, Windham, NH. 20 room castle completed in 1915 at a cost of approximately $1,250,000, modeled on the Stanton Harcourt Castle in Oxfordshire, England.
 Edward F. Searles Estate in Methuen, Massachusetts
 Dream House, now known as Searles Mansion, Block Island, Rhode Island Constructed 1886-1888 as a home for Searles and his wife, it had a "twin house" design with each of the Searles' having a separate identical side of the mansion.
 Mary Francis Searles Science Building, Bowdoin College, Brunswick, Maine
 Various schools and churches

He was also an environmentalist and would alter the construction course of a major stone wall so as to preserve a tree that he deemed important.

His surname (as well as that of fellow "Methuen city fathers" Charles H. Tenney and David C. Nevins, Jr.) appears in the name of the "Searles Tenney Nevins Historic District" established by the City of Methuen in 1992 to preserve the "distinctive architecture and rich character of one of Massachusetts’ most unique neighborhoods".  According to the City of Methuen:"Today, the trio’s collective vision can be seen in mills, housing, schools, mansions, churches, monuments, playgrounds, the library, and the architectural fantasies that resulted from their artistic rivalry. The historic district boundaries were established to include properties and buildings constructed or used by the Searles, Tenney and Nevins families and the people who worked for them."

References

External links

 
Methuen Memorial Music Hall
Genealogy of Edward Francis SEARLES & Mary Frances SHERWOOD
Genealogy of Mark HOPKINS & Mary Frances SHERWOOD

1841 births
1920 deaths
People from Methuen, Massachusetts
Architects from Massachusetts